Nostromo is a 1997 British-Italian television drama series directed by Alastair Reid and produced by Fernando Ghia of Pixit Productions, a co-production with Radiotelevisione Italiana, Televisión Española, and WGBH Boston. The music is composed by Ennio Morricone. It stars Claudio Amendola, Paul Brooke, Lothaire Bluteau, Claudia Cardinale, Colin Firth and Albert Finney. It is described as "an adaptation of Joseph Conrad's epic story Nostromo of political upheaval, greed and romance in turn-of-the-20th-century South America."

Cast
Claudio Amendola as Nostromo
Paul Brooke as Capt. Mitchell
Lothaire Bluteau as Martin Decoud
Claudia Cardinale as Teresa Viola
Joaquim de Almeida as Col. Sotillo
Brian Dennehy as Joshua C. Holroyd
Albert Finney as Dr. Monygham
Colin Firth as Charles Gould
Roberto Escobar as Pedro Montero
Ruth Gabriel as Antonia Avellanos
Fernando Hilbeck as Don Jose Avellanos
Serena Scott Thomas as Emilia Gould
Salvatore Basile as Gen. Montero 
Xavier Burbano as Ramirez
Emiliano Díez as Don Pepe
Romina Mondello as Giselle Viola
Stefania Montorsi as Linda Viola
Arnoldo Foà as Giorgio Viola

Release and reception
The series was filmed in Cartagena de Indias, Colombia over twenty weeks in 1995. It had a budget of about 20 million dollars. It premiered on 25 June 1996 at the 48th Prix Italia Festival. Nostromo was later broadcast on the American channel PBS's Masterpiece Theatre and Italian channel Raiuno on 5 January 1997, and was shown on BBC 2 in the UK from 1 February 1997.
The series was nominated for an ALMA Award for Outstanding Latino/a Cast in a Made-for-Television Movie or Mini-Series and Claudio Amendola won the Golden Pegasus Award for Best Television Actor at the Italian Flaiano International Prizes.

References

External links 
 

1997 Italian television series debuts
1997 Italian television series endings
1990s Italian television series
Italian television miniseries
Italian television series
1990s British television miniseries
Period television series
1997 British television series debuts
1997 British television series endings
1990s British drama television series
BBC television dramas
English-language television shows
Films scored by Ennio Morricone
Films based on works by Joseph Conrad
Films directed by Alastair Reid
Television shows based on works by Joseph Conrad